Eva Cheng, GBS (born 31 May 1960, Hong Kong) was the Secretary for Transport and Housing and the chairman of the Hong Kong Housing Authority in the Hong Kong Government.

She joined as a civil servant in the Administrative Service in 1983.

Cheng has served in various bureaux and departments in the government, including Deputy Head of the Central Policy Unit (1996–1998), Deputy Director of Administration (1997), Deputy Secretary for Information Technology and Broadcasting (later renamed Deputy Secretary for Commerce, Industry and Technology) (1998–2003), Commissioner for Tourism (2003–2006), and Permanent Secretary for Economic Development and Labour (Economic Development) (2006–2007).

References

Further reading 
"Steering committee to study regulation of first-hand flat sale by legislation", Hong Kong Government News, Information Services Department of the Government of the Hong Kong Special Administrative Region, 20 October 2010
 "Eva Cheng visits Chongqing", Hong Kong Government News, Information Services Department of the Government of the Hong Kong Special Administrative Region, 21 February 2012
 "Asian Aerospace Congress looks to critical issues", Flight Daily News, 3 September 2007

External links
"Ms Eva Cheng, GBS, JP, Secretary for Transport and Housing", Official Biodata, Government of Hong Kong, July 2011

1960 births
Living people
Government officials of Hong Kong
Hong Kong civil servants
Hong Kong women in politics